Mikael Birk Giæver Ugland (born 24 January 2000) is a Norwegian football midfielder who plays for Jerv.

Following a youth career in Start, he made his senior debut in the 2017 Norwegian Football Cup before joining Flekkerøy IL on loan in 2018. Returning to Start, he made his league debut in May 2019 and his first-tier debut in June 2020 against Sandefjord. In the next game, against Molde, he scored his first Start goal. He moved to Jerv in February 2022.

References

2000 births
Living people
Sportspeople from Kristiansand
Norwegian footballers
IK Start players
Flekkerøy IL players
FK Jerv players
Norwegian First Division players
Eliteserien players
Association football midfielders
Norway youth international footballers